José Vicente "Tente" Sánchez Felip (born 8 October 1956) is a Spanish retired footballer who played as a midfielder.

Club career
Born in Barcelona, Catalonia, Sánchez adjusted quickly to local FC Barcelona's first team, appearing in four matches and scoring once in the 1975–76 season whilst he was still registered with the reserve squad. From there onwards, although never an automatic first-choice, he was used regularly, helping the club to three Spanish Cups and two UEFA Cup Winners' Cups – in the first final, a 4–3 win against Fortuna Düsseldorf, he opened the scoresheet.

Sánchez then helped Barça to another continental final, the 1985–86 European Cup, lost at Ramón Sánchez Pizjuán Stadium in Seville on penalties, to FC Steaua București. By then, he was already a secondary player (only 22 matches in his last two years combined, although he did contribute with 13 La Liga matches to his first title in the competition), and left for fellow league team Real Murcia in the 1986 summer, posting two more solid seasons.

Sánchez retired in 1990, after having played – in the second level – with another Catalan side, CE Sabadell FC. Also during that decade, he became a players agent.

International career
Sánchez earned 14 caps for the Spain national team during slightly more than five years, his debut coming on 4 October 1978 in a 2–1 win in Yugoslavia for the UEFA Euro 1980 qualifiers, replacing Real Madrid's Juanito – who had scored – with five minutes left.

He was selected for the squad at the 1982 FIFA World Cup played in his country, and appeared in four matches as the nation exited in the second group stage.

Honours
Barcelona
La Liga: 1984–85
Copa del Rey: 1977–78, 1980–81, 1982–83
Supercopa de España: 1983
Copa de la Liga: 1983, 1986
UEFA Cup Winners' Cup: 1978–79, 1981–82
European Cup: Runner-up 1985–86

References

External links

1956 births
Living people
Footballers from Barcelona
Spanish footballers
Association football midfielders
La Liga players
Segunda División players
FC Barcelona Atlètic players
FC Barcelona players
Real Murcia players
CE Sabadell FC footballers
Spain youth international footballers
Spain under-21 international footballers
Spain amateur international footballers
Spain B international footballers
Spain international footballers
Olympic footballers of Spain
Footballers at the 1976 Summer Olympics
1982 FIFA World Cup players
Association football agents